Popeyes Louisiana Kitchen, Inc., also known as Popeyes and formerly named Popeyes Chicken & Biscuits and Popeyes Famous Fried Chicken & Biscuits, is an American multinational chain of fried chicken fast food restaurants formed in 1972 in New Orleans, Louisiana and headquartered in Miami. It is currently a subsidiary of Toronto-based Restaurant Brands International. , Popeyes has 3,705 restaurants, which are located in more than 46 states and the District of Columbia, Puerto Rico, and 30 countries worldwide. About 50 locations are company-owned; the vast remainder are franchised.

History
Popeyes was formed in Arabi, Louisiana, a suburb of New Orleans, Louisiana, in St. Bernard Parish. It first opened its doors on June 12, 1972, as "Chicken on the Run". Owner Al Copeland (1944–2008) wanted to compete with Kentucky Fried Chicken, but his restaurant failed after several months. Copeland reopened the restaurant four days later as Popeyes Mighty Good Chicken. By 1975, the company had been renamed as Popeyes Famous Fried Chicken. Copeland started franchising his restaurant in 1976, beginning in Louisiana. The chain expanded to Canada in 1984, and opened its 500th restaurant in 1985. B. P. Newman of Laredo, Texas, acquired several franchises in Texas and surrounding states. Two hundred additional locations were added during a period of slower expansion.

By 1990, Copeland Enterprises was in default on $391 million in debts it had taken on in its 1989 purchase of Church's, a rival fast food chain also focusing in fried chicken, and by April 1991, the company filed for bankruptcy protection. In October 1992, the court approved a plan by a group of Copeland's creditors that resulted in the creation of America's Favorite Chicken Company, Inc. (AFC) to serve as the new parent company for Popeyes and Church's. AFC went public in 2001 with initial public offering (IPO) of $142,818,479. On December 29, 2004, AFC sold Church's to Arcapita (formerly Crescent Capital Investments) retaining Popeyes.

On August 8, 2000, Popeyes announced a franchise development plan/agreement that included 35 new restaurant locations around Australia in a bid to solidify their presence within the Asia Pacific region. All were to be located in Sydney, the capital city of New South Wales.

On June 17, 2014, Popeyes announced it had re-acquired full control of its seasonings, recipes, and other proprietary food preparation techniques from Diversified Foods & Seasonings, which remained under the control of Al Copeland and his estate after the creditor sale of Popeyes to AFC. Popeyes had continued to license the seasonings, recipes, and techniques from DF&S for a yearly 'spice royalty', before buying them outright for $43 million. DF&S remains the main supplier for Popeyes until at least 2029.

Acquisition by Restaurant Brands International 
On February 21, 2017, Restaurant Brands International announced a deal to buy Popeyes for US$1.8 billion. On March 27, 2017, the deal closed with RBI purchasing Popeyes at $79 per share via Orange, Inc, an indirect subsidiary of RBI.

Name
Alvin C. Copeland claimed he named the stores after the fictional detective Jimmy "Popeye" Doyle (portrayed by Gene Hackman) in the 1971 film The French Connection, which came out a year before the chain was founded, and not the comic strip  character Popeye the Sailor. 

However, the company's early brand became deeply tied to the cartoon star with its sponsorship of the Popeye & Pals children's show in New Orleans, and the character appeared on items from packaging to racing boats.

The chain later acquired rights to use Popeye the Sailor for marketing and used this for 35 years. In late November 2012, AFC announced the mutual termination of their licensing contract with King Features Syndicate, effectively ending their association with the Popeye characters.

The name is spelled "Popeyes", without the apostrophe commonly used by other restaurant chains such as McDonald's and Hardee's. Copeland claimed facetiously that he was "too poor" to afford an apostrophe.

Products

Popeyes serves chicken dishes in mild and spicy flavors and offers sides such as red beans and rice, Cajun fries, mashed potatoes with Cajun-style gravy, Cajun rice, macaroni & cheese, biscuits, and coleslaw. In addition to chicken, Popeyes also serves seafood entrées such as shrimp and catfish. On October 30, 2006, AFC announced that Popeyes planned to introduce a trans fat-free biscuit as well as french fries containing one gram of trans fat by year-end. On November 18, 2011, AFC announced that, for the Thanksgiving holiday, Popeyes would release a Fried Turducken sandwich that would show off the first ever Turducken patty. On July 29, 2013, AFC began offering a special entree of fried chicken strips dipped in waffle batter, which was already a proven success in some markets. For a limited time only in 2017, Popeyes offered "Sweet and Crunchy" chicken, fried chicken tenders coated in shortbread cookie breading. In 2021, Popeyes introduced a flounder sandwich.

Chicken sandwich

Popeyes began selling a chicken sandwich in August 2019 to compete with Chick-fil-A's similar flagship sandwich. The company first launched the sandwich at Long Beach restaurant Sweet Dixie Kitchen, a locally-famous spot that had become known for reselling fried chicken that it had purchased at Popeyes. The sandwich launched nationwide to all locations in the U.S on August 12, 2019, but had some advance openings at the beginning of 2019.

The marketing campaign, designed by advertising agency GSD&M started on August 12, 2019, with a tweet on Popeyes' Twitter feed. The new sandwich went viral immediately and prompted responses from nearly every fast food chain including McDonald's, Chick-Fil-A, and Wendy's. Popeyes reported a 103% increase in traffic in the days following the launch of the sandwich. The sandwich helped Popeyes gather an estimated $23 million in free publicity since its launch. Popeyes stores routinely sold out of the sandwich and experienced long lines, and a man outside of a Maryland Popeyes chain was stabbed to death during a dispute over a cutting in line for a chicken sandwich. Locations across the US were supposed to have enough materials to last them until the end of September. Instead, restaurants were almost entirely sold out after less than two weeks. On August 27, approximately two weeks after the launch, Popeyes announced that it had officially sold out of the chicken sandwich across the country. One person in Tennessee sued Popeyes, claiming that his inability to get the sandwich has caused him to be "hustled out of money", making Popeyes guilty of "false advertising" along with "deceptive business practices". On October 28, 2019, Popeyes announced that the chicken sandwich would return to locations across the US on November 3.
Popeyes chicken sandwich is made of buttermilk-battered white meat on a brioche bun along with pickles and mayonnaise or spicy Cajun spread. A single sandwich contains 700 calories, 42 grams of fat, 14 grams of saturated fat, 1.5 trans fat, 1443 milligrams of sodium, and 28 net grams of protein.

In September 2020, Popeyes' chicken sandwich went on sale in Canada.

Style and marketing

The restaurants' exteriors have a distinctive orange and white color scheme. The original locations had a black lava rock exterior with a red shingled roof. Most older locations have covered the rock exterior to conform with the current orange stucco appearance. During the 1970s and 1980s, the company occasionally licensed characters from the Popeye comic strip to use in its advertising. TV and radio ads often use New Orleans-style music, along with the trademark "Love That Chicken" jingle sung by New Orleans funk and R&B musician Dr. John.

In 2009, Popeyes introduced "Annie the Chicken Queen", a fictitious, upbeat, African-American Popeyes chef played by actress Deidrie Henry. The character is meant to be "honest, vibrant, youthful and authentic" according to Dick Lynch, Popeyes Chief Marketing Officer. "Everyone has a relative or a good friend who will give it to them straight, and that's what the Annie is all about", Lynch said.

Popeyes has sponsored various NASCAR drivers since 2000. That year, NASCAR Busch Series driver Rich Bickle was sponsored by the company for six races, while Mark McFarland received a one-race deal in the same series the following season. In March 2018, Tyler Matthews made his NASCAR Camping World Truck Series debut in the No. 99 Popeyes truck at Martinsville Speedway, and the company also sponsored Brennan Poole and Vizion Motorsports for that year's Truck Series season finale at Homestead–Miami Speedway.

Popeyes has made use of various slogans in television advertisements, most notably "Love that chicken from Popeyes".

Number of franchises
Popeyes maintains a "Hall of Fame" of its franchise holders. Some international franchises, such as the ones located in Germany, 
and Japan, are located only on U.S. military installations and are generally not accessible to the local civilian public. Popeyes arrived in the Philippines in 2001 but left in 2007 due to a problem with the franchisor; it later returned with a new deal with Kuya J Group in 2018 and opened its first branch in Pasig on May 19, 2019. Popeyes opened the first store in China on May 15, 2020 and in March 2021, it announced plans to open stores in Mexico and the United Kingdom, with the first restaurant in the latter country, locating at Westfield Stratford City opening on November 20, 2021.
Restaurant Brands International signed a master franchise and development agreement with Indian company Jubilant FoodWorks on March 24, 2021, to operate Popeyes restaurants in India, Bangladesh, Nepal and Bhutan. The first Popeyes restaurant in South Asia opened in Bambalapitiya, Sri Lanka on February 25, 2021. In December 2020, Popeyes announced that it will be closing all locations in South Korea, due to poor sales partially attributed to the COVID-19 pandemic. In October 2021, Popeyes signed an agreement with Romanian company Sterling Cruise to open 90 restaurants in Romania in the next 10 years, the first one opened on April 9, 2022. Popeyes opened its first store in Indonesia in 2000 under PT Popeyes Chicken Seafood Indonesia (later taken over by PT Popindo Selera Prima in 2002) and had opened its store in Jakarta, Bandung, Yogyakarta, Surabaya, Medan and Samarinda, but the last store in Puri Indah Mall, West Jakarta closed in 2011. Popeyes returned to Indonesia under PT Sari Chicken Indonesia, an affiliate of Mitra Adiperkasa and opened its first store in Skyline Building, Central Jakarta on December 23, 2022.

See also
 Cheryl Bachelder
 List of fast-food chicken restaurants

References

External links

 
 
 
 

Companies based in Miami
American companies established in 1972
Restaurants established in 1972
American subsidiaries of foreign companies
Fast-food chains of the United States
Chicken chains of the United States
Fast-food franchises
Fast-food poultry restaurants
Restaurant Brands International
1972 establishments in Louisiana
2017 mergers and acquisitions
Companies formerly listed on the Nasdaq
Fried chicken
Companies that filed for Chapter 11 bankruptcy in 1991